Donald James Allan,  (22 December 1907 – 19 June 1978) was a British classical scholar. He was Professor of Greek at the University of Glasgow from 1957 to 1971. Allan was educated at Christ's Hospital School and then at Christ Church, Oxford. During the Second World War he worked at Bletchley Park.

Selected publications
Aristotle, De Caelo, 1936. (Editor)
Plato, The Republic, 1940. (Editor)
"Mediaeval Versions of Aristotle, De Caelo, and of the Commentary of Simplicius" in Mediaeval and Renaissance Studies, Vol. 2 (1950), pp. 82–120.
The Philosophy of Aristotle, Oxford University Press, 1952. (Home University Library of Modern Knowledge No. 222)

References 

1907 births
1978 deaths
Academics of the University of Glasgow
People educated at Christ's Hospital
Alumni of Christ Church, Oxford
Fellows of Balliol College, Oxford
Academics of the University of Edinburgh
Fellows of the British Academy
Bletchley Park people